The FIFA Women's Club World Cup is an international women's association football competition that is proposed by the Fédération Internationale de Football Association (FIFA), the sport's global governing body. , plans for the competition have been considered by FIFA but not approved.

History
The International Women's Club Championship (IWCC) was the first international annual competition contested by women's champion clubs. The competition was founded and organised by the Japan Football Association and the L. League. The first International Women's Club Championship took place in Japan in November 2012 with participation from four teams: Olympique Lyonnais (Europe), Canberra United (Australia), INAC Kobe Leonessa (Japan) and NTV Beleza (cup winner, Japan).

In October 2012, L-League's senior executive, Yoshinori Taguchi, announced that he intended the IWCC run for three years and expand to include more continental champions. It was also envisaged that FIFA would ultimately endorse the tournament as a female equivalent of the FIFA Club World Cup.

In October 2013, FIFA's executive committee heard a proposal from their Women's Football Task Force to explore the idea of an official FIFA Women's Club World Cup. The board of the Brazilian club São José, winner of the 2013 Copa Libertadores Femenina, went so far as to say that FIFA had approved the holding of an interclub tournament between the South American champions and 2012–13 UEFA Women's Champions League champions VfL Wolfsburg during 2014. However, the proposed match between the two continental champions never progressed beyond the planning stages.

In 2015 the FIFA Women's Football Task Force again proposed the creation of the FIFA Women's Club World Cup. The Task Force also proposed an increase in teams and in development of competitions at confederation level in relation to the FIFA Women's Club World Cup.

A friendly played between Arsenal L.F.C. (FA Women's Cup holders) and Seattle Reign FC (NWSL Shield holders) on 26 May 2016 (finished with a draw of 1–1) at Memorial Stadium in Seattle was described as "a stepping stone to the grand idea of a FIFA Women's Club World Cup."

In 2017, Chief Women's Football Officer Sarai Bareman mentioned the possibility of a Women's Club World Cup, in saying that "we have to be very careful about how we introduce it, when we introduce it and it has to include all regions. As you well know, not all regions are at the same development level but there’s an amazing opportunity that exists, but we have to be very strategic and careful about how we do it."

During the closing press conference for the 2019 FIFA Women's World Cup, president Gianni Infantino outlined a proposal for the creation of the tournament "starting as soon as possible" as a step towards the future development of women's football. In December 2022, FIFA announced plans to establish a Women's Club World Cup but that the women's football calendar would remain unchanged until 2025.

See also

FIFA Club World Cup (men's)

References

External links

 
Women's international association football competitions
Women's Club World Cup
Club, Women's